Andrejs Rastorgujevs (born 27 May 1988) is a Latvian biathlete. He has participated in three Winter Olympics, and has two individual and one relay Biathlon World Cup podium.

Career
Andrejs Rastorgujevs is a biathlete from Latvia. In the first event of 2009–10 Biathlon World Cup in Östersund he participated in 10 km sprint, where he finished 47th, but later on he was disqualified for finishing in the wrong lane. 2012-13 Biathlon World Cup was the breakthrough season for Rastorgujevs, finishing the season 36th overall. Next year he finished the season 16th overall, while earning four Top 6 finishes.

After finishing fourth four times during his career, during the last race of 2016-17 Biathlon World Cup he finally won his first podium, finishing second at the 15 km mass start in Oslo.

Rastorgujevs took part also at the 2010 Winter Olympics, where he finished 50th at the sprint and 58th at the pursuit.

In 2021, Rastorgujevs was disqualified for 18 months due to doping rules violations.

On 5 March 2023 Rastorgujevs and Baiba Bendika placed third, in the BMW IBU World Cup placed in Nové Město na Moravě, in the Single Mixed Relays and earned a first-ever Relay podium for Latvia.

Career results

Olympics

World Championships

World Cup 

*Key:Points—won World Cup points; Position—World Cup season ranking.

European Championships

World Cup record

Finish in the Top 6

Shooting

References

External links
 
 
 
 

1988 births
Living people
People from Alūksne
Latvian male biathletes
Olympic biathletes of Latvia
Biathletes at the 2010 Winter Olympics
Biathletes at the 2014 Winter Olympics
Biathletes at the 2018 Winter Olympics
Latvian Academy of Sport Education alumni
Latvian sportspeople in doping cases
Doping cases in biathlon